Sebastian Petrycy of Pilzno (born 1554 in Pilzno – died 1626 in Kraków), in Latin known as Sebastianus Petricius, was a Polish philosopher and physician. He lectured and published notable works in the field of medicine but is principally remembered for his masterly Polish translations of philosophical works by Aristotle and for his commentaries to them. Petrycy made major contributions to nascent Polish philosophical terminology.

Life
Sebastian Petrycy received his Master of Arts degree at Kraków in 1573 and his doctor of medicine degree at Padua in 1590.

Petrycy published his Polish translations of Aristotle's practical works, the Ethics, Politics and Economics, together with his own extensive commentaries. In these, he laid stress, in the theory of knowledge, on experiment and induction; in psychology, on feeling and will; and in politics, he preached democratic ideas. The focus of his thought was practical philosophy, ethics and politics. His interest in practical questions and his linking of philosophical theory with the needs of national life was a feature  common to Petrycy and to leading Polish thinkers of periods that were to follow.

In 1601-18, a period when translations into modern languages were still rarities, he accomplished masterful translations of Aristotle's practical works into Polish.  With Petrycy, vernacular Polish philosophical terminology began to develop not much later than did the French and German. This was an auspicious beginning, but would be neglected in the 17th and 18th centuries.

Petrycy practiced medicine in Lwów and at the side of Wojewoda Jerzy Mniszech, whom he accompanied to Moscow in 1606.

In 1608–17 Petrycy lectured in medicine at the Kraków Academy. His medical writings, which included "De natura, causis, symptomatis morbi gallici eiusque curatione...", combined deductive reasoning with observation and experiment. An educator and practicing physician, he worked especially among the poor populace.

See also
History of philosophy in Poland
List of Poles
Physician writer

Notes

References
 Władysław Tatarkiewicz, Zarys dziejów filozofii w Polsce (A Brief History of Philosophy in Poland), [in the series:]  Historia nauki polskiej w monografiach (History of Polish Learning in Monographs), [volume] XXXII, Kraków, Polska Akademia Umiejętności (Polish Academy of Learning), 1948.  This monograph draws from pertinent sections in earlier editions of the author's Historia filozofii (History of Philosophy).
 Władysław Tatarkiewicz, Historia filozofii (History of Philosophy), volume two, Warsaw, Państwowe Wydawnictwo Naukowe, 1978.
 "Petrycy, Sebastian," Encyklopedia Polski (Encyclopedia of Poland), Kraków, Wydawnictwo Ryszard Kluszczyński, 1996, p. 496.
 "Petrycy Sebastian z Pilzna," Encyklopedia Powszechna PWN (PWN Universal Encyclopedia), Warsaw, Państwowe Wydawnictwo Naukowe, vol. 3, 1975, p. 501.

External links
 Works by Sebastian Petrycy in digital library Polona

1554 births
1626 deaths
People from Dębica County
17th-century Polish philosophers
Jagiellonian University alumni
University of Padua alumni
16th-century Polish physicians
17th-century Polish physicians
Academic staff of Jagiellonian University